Drupa morum, common name the purple drupe, is a species of sea snail, a marine gastropod mollusk in the family Muricidae, the murex snails or rock snails.

Subspecies 
 Drupa morum iodostoma (Lesson, 1840) (synonym : Purpura (Ricinula) iodostoma Lesson, 1840 ) (species inquirenda)
 Drupa morum morum Röding, 1798 (synonyms : Canrena neritoidea Link, 1807; Drupa horrida (Lamarck, 1816), Drupa morum Röding, 1798, Drupa (Drupa) morum morum Röding, 1798; Drupa violacea (Schumacher, 1817); Ricinella violacea Schumacher, 1817; Ricinula globosa Mörch, 1852; Ricinula horrida Lamarck, 1816)

Description
Thick, globose shell, up to 5 cm, with low spire, large body whorl and flat base. Colour white with dark brown nodules. Dark violet, narrow aperture with conspicuous groups of denticles. Columella with three strong, plicate ridges.

Distribution
Drupa morum lives in the Indo-Pacific.
 Aldabra (from invalid distribution)
 Chagos (from invalid distribution)
 Kenya (from invalid distribution)
 Madagascar
 Mascarene Basin (from invalid distribution)
 Mauritius (from invalid distribution)
 Red Sea (from invalid distribution)
 Tanzania

Habitat 
Habitat of Drupa morum include rocky shores and in crevices among lower eulittoral rocks.

References

 Spry, J.F. (1961). The sea shells of Dar es Salaam: Gastropods. Tanganyika Notes and Records 56
 Dautzenberg, Ph. (1929). Mollusques testaces marins de Madagascar. Faune des Colonies Francaises, Tome III
 Houart R., Kilburn R.N. & Marais A.P. (2010) Muricidae. pp. 176–270, in: Marais A.P. & Seccombe A.D. (eds), Identification guide to the seashells of South Africa. Volume 1. Groenkloof: Centre for Molluscan Studies. 376 pp. 
 Claremont M., Reid D.G. & Williams S.T. (2012) Speciation and dietary specialization in Drupa, a genus of predatory marine snails (Gastropoda: Muricidae). Zoologica Scripta 41: 137–149.

External links
 

morum
Gastropods described in 1798